USS LST-814 was an  in the United States Navy. Like many of her class, she was not named and is properly referred to by her hull designation.

LST-814 was laid down on 25 August 1944 at Evansville, Indiana, by the Missouri Valley Bridge & Iron Co.; launched on 4 October 1944; sponsored by Mrs. William B. Fletcher; and commissioned on 27 October 1944.

Service history
During World War II, LST-814 was assigned to the Asiatic-Pacific theater and participated in the assault and occupation of Okinawa Gunto from March through May 1945. Following the end of the war, in September 1945, LST-814 performed occupation duty in the Far East until mid-April 1946. During this period, she was severely damaged during a beaching operation off Sasebo, Japan, on 30 December 1945. The tank landing ship was decommissioned on 16 April 1946 and struck from the Navy list on 8 May that same year. LST-814 was later sunk on 12 August 1946.

LST-814 earned one battle star for World War II service.

References

 

LST-542-class tank landing ships
World War II amphibious warfare vessels of the United States
Ships built in Evansville, Indiana
1944 ships